Nikiema is a surname. Notable people with the surname include:

Abdoul-Aziz Nikiema (born 1985), Burkinabé footballer
Elisabeth Nikiema (born 1982), Burkinabé swimmer
Issa Nikiema (born 1978), Burkinabé footballer
Kadidia Nikiema, Burkinabé Paralympic cyclist
Victor Nikiema (born 1993), Burkinabé footballer
Kilian Nikiema

See also
Stéphane Nikiéma (born 1965), French kickboxer